The 1916 Vermont gubernatorial election took place on November 7, 1916. Incumbent Republican Charles W. Gates, per the "Mountain Rule", did not run for re-election to a second term as Governor of Vermont. Republican candidate Horace F. Graham defeated Democratic candidate William B. Mayo to succeed him.

Republican primary

Results

Democratic primary

Results

General election

Results

References

Vermont
1916
Gubernatorial
November 1916 events